The common emerald (Hemithea aestivaria) is a moth of the family Geometridae. The species is found throughout the Nearctic and Palearctic regions and the Near East. It is mostly commonly found in the southern half of the British Isles. It was accidentally introduced into southern British Columbia in 1973.

All wings are generally dark green with grey and white chequered fringes and narrow white fascia, two on the forewing, one on the hindwing. The green colouration tends not to fade over time as much as in other emeralds. The hindwings have a sharply angled termen giving the moth a very distinctive shape. The wingspan is 30–35 mm. It flies at dusk and night in June and July and will come to light.

The larva is green with reddish-brown markings and black v-shaped marks along the back. The young larva will feed on most plants but later it feeds on trees and shrubs. The species overwinters as a larva.

  The flight season refers to the British Isles. This may vary in other parts of the range.

Recorded food plants
Aralia
Artemisia
Betula – birch
Camellia
Carpinus – hornbeam
Castanea – chestnut
Citrus
Corylus – hazel
Crataegus - hawthorn
Diervilla – bush honeysuckle
Hypericum – St John's wort
Juglans – walnut
Larix – larch
Ligustrum – privet
Malus – apple
Morus – mulberry
Photinia
Prunus
Quercus – oak
Rhamnus – buckthorn
Ribes – currant
Rosa – rose
Rubus
Salix – willow
Sorbus – rowan
Tilia – lime
Vaccinium
Viburnum

Gallery

References

Chinery, Michael Collins Guide to the Insects of Britain and Western Europe 1986 (Reprinted 1991)
Skinner, Bernard Colour Identification Guide to Moths of the British Isles 1984

External links

Common emerald UKMoths

"07980 Hemithea aestivaria (Hübner, 1789) - Gebüsch-Grünspanner". Lepiforum e.V. Retrieved November 30, 2018.

Hemitheini
Moths described in 1799
Moths of North America
Moths of Europe
Moths of Japan
Moths of Asia
Taxa named by Jacob Hübner